Oswego Armory is a historic National Guard armory located at Oswego in Oswego County, New York.  It is a brick and stone castle-like structure built in 1906–1908. It was designed by State architect George L. Heins. It consists of a -story administration building with an attached large, gable-roofed drill shed.  The building features a 5-story octagonal tower at the northwest corner.

It was listed on the National Register of Historic Places in 1988.

Oswego YMCA 

After the closing of the Armory in 2004, The Oswego YMCA purchased the Armory and now runs most of its Child and Teen activities out of the building.

Humane Society 
The Humane Society rents a single room in the basement of the Armory.

References

External links
Oswego Armory - Oswego, NY - U.S. National Register of Historic Places on Waymarking.com
Todd, Nancy L., 

Armories on the National Register of Historic Places in New York (state)
Infrastructure completed in 1906
Buildings and structures in Oswego County, New York
Oswego, New York
National Register of Historic Places in Oswego County, New York
1906 establishments in New York (state)